This is a list of butterfly houses or conservatories around the world. For aquaria, see List of aquaria. For dolphinariums, see List of dolphinariums. For a list of zoos, see List of zoos. For an annotated list of defunct zoos and aquariums, see List of former zoos and aquariums.

A butterfly house, or conservatory is a facility which is specifically intended for the breeding and display of butterflies with an emphasis on education. Some butterfly houses also feature other insects and arthropods.  Butterfly houses are owned and operated by museums, universities, non-profit corporations, and private individuals as part of their residence; as well as small businesses that are owner operated.

The pattern of butterfly parks is not new. In fact, such exhibits of butterflies were extremely popular in England by the year 1970. Penang Butterfly Farm in Malaysia was introduced on March 29, 1986; it was the tropical world's first creepy crawly and live butterfly haven. In the United States, the first butterfly stop, Butterfly World, opened in Coconut Creek, Florida in 1988.

Americas

Canada
 Butterfly World COOMBS, Coombs, British Columbia
 Cambridge Butterfly Conservatory, Cambridge, Ontario
 F. Jean MacLeod Butterfly Gallery at Science North, Sudbury, Ontario
 John's Butterfly House at Windmill Garden Centre, Medicine Hat, Alberta
  Montreal Insectarium, Montreal, Quebec
 Newfoundland Insectarium, Deer Lake, Newfoundland and Labrador
 Niagara Parks Butterfly Conservatory, Niagara Falls, Ontario
 The Preserve Co. Butterfly House, New Glasgow, Nova Scotia
 Victoria Butterfly Gardens, Brentwood Bay, British Columbia

The Caribbean
 The Butterfly Farm, Saint Martin
 The Butterfly Farm, Aruba
 La Marquesa Forest Park Butterfly House, Guaynabo, Puerto Rico

Mexico
 Jardin Magico Butterfly Sanctuary, Puerto Vallarta, Jalisco 
 Mariposario Chapultepec, Mexico City, Mexico

South and Central America
 Águias da Serra Borboletário São Paulo, Brazil
 Borboletário Fiocruz, Museum of Life Rio de Janeiro, Brazil
 Cali Zoo butterfly house, Cali, Colombia
 Casa de Costa Rica butterfly conservatory, el castillo, Costa Rica
 El Mariposario, Quindío, Colombia
Mangal das Garças Belém, Pará, Brazil
 Mariposario Mindo, Mindo, Ecuador
 Mariposario Tambopata Butterfly Farm, Peru
 Monteverde Butterfly Gardens, Monteverde, Costa Rica
 Pilpintuwasi Butterfly Farm, Iquitos, Peru

United States

 Academy of Natural Sciences of Drexel University, Philadelphia
 Ashland Nature Center Butterfly House, Delaware Nature Society, Hockessin
Audubon Butterfly Garden and Insectarium , New Orleans, Louisiana
 Aveda Butterfly Garden, Minnesota Zoo, Apple Valley
 Bear Mountain Butterfly Sanctuary, Jim Thorpe
 Berniece Grewcock Butterfly and Insect Pavilion, Henry Doorly Zoo and Aquarium, Omaha
 Bioworks Butterfly Garden, Museum of Science and Industry, Tampa
Blackwater Wildlife Refuge Butterfly Garden (Visitors Center), Blackwater National Wildlife Refuge, Cambridge, Maryland
 Blooming Butterfly Garden, Como Zoo, St. Paul
 Brookside Gardens, Wheaton
 Butterfly Biosphere, Thanksgiving Point, Lehi, Utah
 Butterfly Conservatory and Insect Zoo, Kansas State University, Manhattan
 The Butterfly Farm, Birmingham Zoo, Birmingham
 Butterfly Garden, Bronx Zoo, The Bronx
 The Butterfly House at Churchville, Bucks County, Pennsylvania
 Butterfly Garden, Museum of Science, Boston
 Butterfly House, Detroit Zoo, Royal Oak, Michigan
 Butterfly House, Dayton, Ohio Cox Arboretum MetroPark
 Butterfly House, Mackinac Island
 Butterfly House, Michigan State University, East Lansing
 Butterfly House, Missouri Botanical Garden, Chesterfield
 Butterfly House San Antonio Zoo, San Antonio
 Butterfly House, Whitehouse
 Butteryfly House, The Gardens on Spring Creek, Fort Collins, Colorado
 Butterfly Landing, Franklin Park Zoo, Boston
 Butterfly Magic, Tucson Botanical Gardens, Tucson
 The Butterfly Palace and Rainforest Adventure, Branson, Missouri
 Butterfly Pavilion, National Museum of Natural History, Smithsonian Institution, Washington
 Butterfly Pavilion, Natural History Museum of Los Angeles County, Los Angeles
 Butterfly Pavilion, Westminster, Colorado
 The Butterfly Place, Westford
 Butterfly Wonderland, Scottsdale, United States
 Butterfly World, Six Flags Discovery Kingdom, Vallejo
 California Academy of Sciences, San Francisco
 Cecil B. Day Butterfly Center, Callaway Gardens, Pine Mountain
 Christina Reiman Butterfly Wing, Reiman Gardens, Ames, Iowa
 Cockrell Butterfly Center & Insect Zoo, Houston Museum of Natural Science, Houston
 Florida Museum of Natural History Butterfly Rainforest, Florida Museum of Natural History, Gainesville
 Frederik Meijer Gardens & Sculpture Park, Grand Rapids Charter Township, Michigan
 Key West Butterfly and Nature Conservatory, Key West
 Living Conservatory, North Carolina Museum of Natural Sciences, Raleigh
 Magic Wings Butterfly Conservatory, South Deerfield
 Magic Wings Butterfly House, North Carolina Museum of Life and Science, Durham
 Marshall Butterfly Pavilion, Desert Botanical Garden, Phoenix
 Monsanto Insectarium, Saint Louis Zoological Park, St. Louis
 The Montgomery Zoo, Montgomery, Alabama (constructing a butterfly house which is planned to float in the natural lake on which the zoo was built)
 Orange County Native Butterfly House, The Environmental Nature Center, Newport Beach
 Panhandle Butterfly House, Milton, Florida
 Puelicher Butterfly Wing, Milwaukee Public Museum, Milwaukee
 Sertoma Butterfly House, Sioux Falls
 Tradewinds Park Butterfly World, Coconut Creek
 Tropical Butterfly House, Pacific Science Center, Seattle
 Western Colorado Botanical Gardens and Butterfly House, Grand Junction, Colorado

Africa
 Exotic Animal World, Stellenbosch, South Africa.

Asia

 Butterfly Conservatory Of Goa, Goa, India 
Botanical Garden and Butterfly House Jallo Lahore, Pakistan
 Butterfly Park Bangladesh, Chittagong, Bangladesh
 Butterfly Park, Bannerghatta National Park, Bangalore, India 
 Butterfly safari Park, Thenmala, Kerala, India
 Dubai Butterfly Garden, Dubai, United Arab Emirates
 Kadoorie Farm and Botanic Garden, Hong Kong
 Konya Tropical Butterfly Garden, Konya, Turkey
 Ocean Park, Hong Kong
 Tropical butterfly conservatory, Trichy, Trichy, Tamil Nadu, India
 Wetland Park, Hong Kong

Southeast Asia
 Banteay Srey Butterfly Centre, Siem Reap, Cambodia. Largest enclosed butterfly house in Southeast Asia.
 Bantimurung – Bulusaraung National Park, Indonesia
 Kuala Lumpur Butterfly Park, Kuala Lumpur, Malaysia
 Melaka Butterfly and Reptile Sanctuary, Ayer Keroh, Malacca, Malaysia
 Phuket Butterfly Garden & Insect World, Phuket, Thailand
 Penang Butterfly Farm, Penang, Malaysia 
 Simply Butterflies Conservation Center, Bilar, Bohol, Philippines
 Singapore Zoological Gardens - The Fragile Forest Enclosure (Singapore)

Europe

United Kingdom
 Butterfly Gardens @ Middleton Common Farm. (Mid Sussex) Sussexbutterflygardens.co.uk
 Blenheim Palace Butterfly House, Woodstock, Oxfordshire
 Golders Hill Park, London
 Guys Butterfly house, Cornwall
 Horniman Museum & Gardens, London
 Landmark Forest Adventure Park, Carrbridge
 Magic of Life Butterfly House, Rheidol Valley, Aberystwyth, Ceredigion, Wales
 Otters and Butterflies, Buckfastleigh
 Seaforde Gardens and Butterfly House, Seaforde, County Down, Northern Ireland
 Stratford Butterfly Farm, Stratford-upon-Avon, Warwickshire
 Studley Grange Garden & Leisure Park, Studley grange craft village
 Tropical Butterfly House and Wildlife Centre, South Yorkshire
 Tropical World, Leeds
 Williamson Park Butterfly House, Lancaster
 Wye Valley Butterfly Zoo, Ross-on-Wye
 ZSL London Zoo, Butterfly paradise, London

Southern Europe

 Bordano Butterfly House, Friuli Venezia Giulia, Italy
 Butterfly Arc, Veneto, Italy
 Butterfly House of Constância, Constância, PORTUGAL
 Butterfly House Sardegna, Sardegna, Italy
 Casa delle Farfalle Monteserra, Viagrande, Italy
 Esapolis, Padua, Italy
 Mariposario de Benalmádena, Andalusia, Spain (largest Butterfly Park in Europe)
 Oasi delle Farfalle di Milano, Lombardia, Italy
 Parque de las Ciencias, Granada, Andalusia, Spain
 Pinocchio, Pistoia, Italy

Western and Northern Europe
 Alaris Schmetterlingspark, Sassnitz, Rügen, Germany
 Artis Vlinderpaviljoen , Amsterdam, Netherlands
 Berkenhof Tropical Zoo, Kwadendamme, Netherlands
 Bornholm Butterfly Park, Bornholm, Denmark
 Botanische Tuinen Fort Hoofddijk, Utrecht, Netherlands
 Burgers' Mangrove, Burgers ZOO,  Arnhem, Netherlands
 Butterfly Botania, University of Eastern Finland, Joensuu, Finland
 Butterfly Garden, Grevenmacher, Luxembourg
 Diergaarde Blijdorp Amazonica , Rotterdam, Netherlands
 Dierenpark Emmen Vlindertuin , Emmen, Netherlands
 Jardin aux Papillons, Vannes, France
 Jardin des découvertes, Die, France
 Jardin des papillons, Hunawihr, France
 La Serre aux papillons La Queue-les-Yvelines, France
 Le carbet amazonien, Velleron, France
 Le tropique du papillon, Elne, France
 L'ile aux papillons, La Guérinière, France
 Micropolis, Le Bourg, France
 Naturo Space, Honfleur, France
 Orchideeën Hoeve, Luttelgeest, Netherlands
 Papiliorama, Havelte, Netherlands
 Parc floral de la source, Orleans, France
 Passiflorahoeve, Vlindertuin Harskamp, Netherlands
 Schmetterlingshaus, Mainau, Baden Württemberg, Germany
 Texel ZOO, Oosterend, Netherlands
 ZOO Antwerpen Wintertuin Antwerpen, Belgium
 Vlinders aan de Vliet, Leidschendam, Netherlands
 Vlindertuin De Kas, Zutphen, Netherlands
 Vlindorado, Waarland, Netherlands
 Wildlands Adventure ZOO Mangrove, Emmen, Netherlands
Papiliorama, Kerzers, Fribourg, Switzerland

Central and Eastern Europe

 Butterfly dome, Druskininkai, Lithuania
 Butterfly House, Praid, Romania
 Butterfly House Varna, Varna, Bulgaria
 Papilonia Butterfly House, Czech Republic
 Schmetterlinghaus, Vienna, Austria
 Wrocław Zoo, Wrocław, Poland

Oceania
 Australian Butterfly Sanctuary, Kuranda, Australia
 Butterfly Creek, Auckland, New Zealand
 Coffs Harbour Butterfly House, Coffs Harbour, Australia
 Melbourne Zoo butterfly enclosure, Melbourne, Australia
 Otago Museum Tūhura Tropical Forest, Dunedin, New Zealand

References

External links

Visiting Butterfly Houses, Farms and Gardens

 
Insectariums